Assurity Life Insurance Company (Assurity) is a mutual insurance organization based in Lincoln, Nebraska. Assurity employs approximately 400 associates and is licensed to conduct business in all U.S. states and the District of Columbia, except New York. The Assurity Life Insurance Company of New York conducts business within the state of New York.

In December 2015, Assurity became a Certified B Corporation, the largest insurance company at the time to earn that designation.

History

Assurity was created as the result of a merger of three Lincoln, Nebraska insurance companies: Woodmen Accident and Life, Security Financial Life, and Lincoln Direct Life. The merger of the companies concluded in 2007. Woodmen Accident and Life began in 1890 using the name Modern Woodmen Accident Association. Security Financial Life began in 1895 using the name Security Mutual Life. Lincoln Direct Life began in 1896 using the name The Royal Highlanders.

Products

Assurity has independently contracted brokers who market individual and worksite insurance products, as well as recently launched in select states direct-to-consumer products.

Individual Insurance Products: 
 Accidental Death
 Critical Illness
 Disability Income
 Life Insurance — Whole Life, Single Premium Whole Life, Term Life, Universal Life
Annuities (Fixed)

Worksite Insurance Products:
 Accident Expense
 Critical Illness
 Short-Term Disability Income
 Hospital Indemnity
 Whole Life
Direct-to-Consumer Products:

 Critical Illness

Independent Rating and Financial Information

A.M. Best Company rated Assurity Life Insurance Company as A− (Excellent). As of Dec. 31, 2021, Assurity had more than $2.66 billion in assets under management.

Assurity has an A+ rating from the Better Business Bureau.

Notability

Opened in 2011, Assurity Center was the first large office building in Lincoln to receive LEED Gold Certification.

As of 2022, Assurity hosts three podcasts. Tips from the Insurance Pros and Focus on Voluntary Benefits center on the individual and worksite sales markets, respectively. Assurity's Good Business Podcast discusses how businesses can use their reach to positively impact their people, community and the planet. Guests have included representatives from Whole Foods Market, Cornell University and the Arbor Day Foundation.

Awards
 America's Best Customer Service Companies, Newsweek, 2021 and 2022
 Voluntary Sales Growth Leader by Eastbridge Consulting Group, 2018, 2019 and 2020
 Recycling Champion Leader, City of Lincoln, 2019
 Recognized by B Lab as a "Best for the World" honoree, best for governance in 2018
 Lincoln's Best Places to Work, 2017
 Impact Award, Downtown Lincoln Association, 2012
 Green Business Award, Lincoln Chamber of Commerce, 2012
 Sustainable Business Award, WasteCap Nebraska, 2012

References

External links
 

Mutual insurance companies of the United States
Companies based in Lincoln, Nebraska